Antoine René Boucher, more commonly known as René Boucher, (1732 in Saint-Germain-en-Laye – 1811 in Paris, France) was a French magistrate and a French revolutionary who served as Mayor of Paris in 1792.

People from Saint-Germain-en-Laye
1732 births
1811 deaths
French magistrates
Mayors of Paris
18th-century French judges